The Neumann Palace is an eclectic building located in Arad. It is a historical monument. It was built in 1891–1892 by the wealthy family of Neumann. It was the biggest building in the city for a long period.

Historic monuments in Arad County
Buildings and structures in Arad, Romania
Tourist attractions in Arad County
Palaces in Romania
Houses completed in 1892